The meridian 153° east of Greenwich is a line of longitude that extends from the North Pole across the Arctic Ocean, Asia, the Pacific Ocean, Australasia, the Southern Ocean, and Antarctica to the South Pole.

The 153rd meridian east forms a great circle with the 27th meridian west.

From Pole to Pole
Starting at the North Pole and heading south to the South Pole, the 153rd meridian east passes through:

{| class="wikitable plainrowheaders"
! scope="col" width="130" | Co-ordinates
! scope="col" | Country, territory or sea
! scope="col" | Notes
|-
| style="background:#b0e0e6;" | 
! scope="row" style="background:#b0e0e6;" | Arctic Ocean
| style="background:#b0e0e6;" |
|-valign="top"
| style="background:#b0e0e6;" | 
! scope="row" style="background:#b0e0e6;" | East Siberian Sea
| style="background:#b0e0e6;" | Passing just east of Zhokhov Island, Sakha Republic,  (at )
|-valign="top"
| 
! scope="row" | 
| Sakha Republic Magadan Oblast — from 
|-
| style="background:#b0e0e6;" | 
! scope="row" style="background:#b0e0e6;" | Sea of Okhotsk
| style="background:#b0e0e6;" |
|-
| 
! scope="row" | 
| Sakhalin Oblast — island of Rasshua, Kuril Islands
|-valign="top"
| style="background:#b0e0e6;" | 
! scope="row" style="background:#b0e0e6;" | Pacific Ocean
| style="background:#b0e0e6;" | Passing just west of the Tanga Islands,  (at )
|-
| 
! scope="row" | 
| Island of New Ireland
|-
| style="background:#b0e0e6;" | 
! scope="row" style="background:#b0e0e6;" | Solomon Sea 
| style="background:#b0e0e6;" |
|-
| 
! scope="row" | 
| Woodlark Island
|-
| style="background:#b0e0e6;" | 
! scope="row" style="background:#b0e0e6;" | Solomon Sea 
| style="background:#b0e0e6;" | Passing just east of Misima Island,  (at )
|-
| 
! scope="row" | 
| Panawina Island in the Louisiade Archipelago
|-valign="top"
| style="background:#b0e0e6;" | 
! scope="row" style="background:#b0e0e6;" | Coral Sea
| style="background:#b0e0e6;" | Passing through 's Coral Sea Islands Territory
|-valign="top"
| 
! scope="row" | 
| Queensland — Fraser Island and mainland, passing through Brisbane (at ) New South Wales — from 
|-
| style="background:#b0e0e6;" | 
! scope="row" style="background:#b0e0e6;" | Pacific Ocean
| style="background:#b0e0e6;" |
|-
| style="background:#b0e0e6;" | 
! scope="row" style="background:#b0e0e6;" | Southern Ocean
| style="background:#b0e0e6;" |
|-
| 
! scope="row" | Antarctica
| Australian Antarctic Territory, claimed by 
|-
|}

See also
152nd meridian east
154th meridian east

e153 meridian east